Corba of Thorigne, Lady of Amboise, daughter of Suplice I, beheaded for no known reason, and daughter-in-law of Fulk IV le Réchin, Count of Anjou.  She inherited one of the three chateaux of Amboise.

Fulk arranged for Corba’s marriage to Aimery of Courran.  Corba’s husband and her uncle Hugh participated in the First Crusade, but her husband was killed at the siege of Nicaea.  Hugh returned wounded but alive.

Widowed, Fulk arranged the marriage of Corba to a very old man, Achard de Saintes. Not happy with the marriage, Corba successfully planned her abduction, and Achard, ailing, died soon afterwards.  Fulk then had Corba marry a prominent knight named Geoffrey Burel, who became Lord of Amboise.

Geoffrey joined the army of William IX in the Crusade of 1101, and typical of William’s army, he brought his wife Corba with him.  William’s prowess in battle was limited and the Turks quickly put an end to his endeavor.  One hundred thousand Christians were captured and assumed killed or sent to slavery, including Geoffrey.  Corba was abducted by the Turks and her fate remains unknown.

Sources 
 Duby, Georges, The Knight, the Lady and the Priest: The Making of Modern Marriage in Medieval France, University of Chicago Press, 1983, pgs 246-7 (available on Google Books)
 Riley-Smith, Jonathan, The First Crusaders, 1095-1131, Cambridge University Press, London, 1997, pgs. 88, 119, 156.
 Prof. J. S. C. Riley-Smith, Prof, Jonathan Phillips, Dr. Alan V. Murray, Dr. Guy Perry, Dr. Nicholas Morton, A Database of Crusaders to the Holy Land, 1099-1149 (available on-line)
 Riley-Smith, Jonathan, The First Crusade and Idea of Crusading, A&C Black, 2003 (available on Google Books)

References

Christians of the First Crusade
Year of birth unknown
Year of death unknown
Medieval slaves
People from the Seljuk Empire
11th-century French women